Kevin Lynch may refer to:
Kevin Lynch (basketball) (born 1968), Minnesota basketball player
Kevin Lynch (beach volleyball) (born 1984), American beach volleyball player
Kevin Lynch (computing), VP at Apple, former CTO of Adobe Systems
Kevin Lynch (hunger striker) (1956–1981), Irish republican
Kevin Lynch (ice hockey) (born 1991), American ice hockey player
Kevin Lynch (judge) (1927–2013), Irish Supreme Court judge
Kevin A. Lynch (1918–1984), American urban planner
 Kevin Lynch Award, named in his honor
Kevin G. Lynch (born 1951), Canadian civil servant
Kevin Lynch, a fictional Criminal Minds character